The 2019 Africa Movie Academy Awards ceremony was held on Sunday 27 October 2019 at the Landmark Event Centre in Lagos, Nigeria. The ceremony recognized and honored excellence among directors, actors, and writers in the film industry. The awards night was hosted by Kemi Lala Akindoju, Lorenzo Menakaya and Funnybone. After receiving up to 700 film entries submitted between 21 October 2018 and 26 January 2019, the organizers of the ceremony announced the nominees on 19 September 2019. The Delivery Boy and Sew the Winter to My Skin led with 13 nominations each while The Burial of Kojo and Redemption followed with 10 each. The Mercy of the Jungle won in the categories Best Film, Achievement in Costume Design, Achievement in Makeup and Best Actor in a Leading Role. Political thriller King of Boys took home three awards on that same night, including awards for Best Actress in a Supporting Role, Best Actress in a Leading Role, as well as Best Nigerian Film.

Awards

Winners are listed first and highlighted in boldface.

References

2019 in Nigeria
2010s in Lagos State
21st century in Lagos
Africa Movie Academy Awards ceremonies
Events in Lagos
2019 film awards
October 2019 events in Nigeria